United Nations Security Council resolution 491, adopted unanimously on 23 September 1981, after examining the application of Belize for membership in the United Nations, the Council recommended to the General Assembly that Belize be admitted.

See also
 Member states of the United Nations
 List of United Nations Security Council Resolutions 401 to 500 (1976–1982)

References
Text of the Resolution at undocs.org

External links
 

 0491
 0491
 0491
1981 in Belize
September 1981 events